George Frost may refer to:

George Frost (New Hampshire politician) (1720–1796), American seaman, jurist, and statesman
George Frost (cricketer) (1848–1913), English cricketer
George Frost (landscape painter) (1754–1821), English landscape painter
George Frost (Australian politician) (1869–1942), Australian politician
George Albert Frost (1843–1907), American artist
George L. Frost (1830–1879), Wisconsin state legislator
George Frost (priest) (born 1935), Anglican priest

See also
George Frost Kennan, U.S. diplomat